New York Nights is a 1929 American pre-Code crime film, directed by Lewis Milestone, and based on the 1928 play Tin Pan Alley by Hugh Stanislaus Stange. The film is known for being leading actress Norma Talmadge's first sound film.

Plot
Jill Deverne is a chorus girl married to alcoholic composer Fred. She wants to show Fred's latest song, "A Year From Today", to racketeer Joe Prividi. Prividi is the producer of the musical show in which she is working, and agrees to use his song. Fred, however, refuses any favors and rejects Prividi's offer. When Prividi uses the song anyway, Fred and his friend Johnny Dolan become drunk and show up at a nightclub.

In a raid, the police discover Fred with chorus girl Ruthie. Jill is disgusted with his behavior and dumps him. She is soon courted by Prividi, who is very overprotective. At a private party, a gambler forces himself on her and is shot by Prividi. Prividi is arrested and sent to jail. Jill does not want to be left behind, and plans a future with Fred. Prividi becomes jealous and sends gunmen to shoot and kill Fred. He is eventually stopped and put in jail, while Jill and Fred ride off in a train to start a new life.

Song
"A Year From Today", the song featured in the film, was composed by Al Jolson, Dave Dreyer, and Ballard McDonald. It was sung in four different styles in the film.

Cast
 Norma Talmadge as Jill Deverne
 Gilbert Roland as Fred Deverne
 John Wray as Joe Prividi
 Lilyan Tashman as Peggy
 Roscoe Karns as Johnny Dolan

Release
The film was highly publicized as Talmadge's first talkie. The film, however, received generally negative reviews. Variety praised Talmadge's acting, but called the film a "stiff test" for her. Photoplay wrote that her fans would not be disappointed with her voice, but stated the story was "full of hokum".

In popular culture
The original poster of the film can be seen in a Chuck E. Cheese location in Akron, Ohio.

References

External links
 
 New York Nights; allmovie.com/ online synopsis
 New York Nights available for free download at Internet Archive

1929 films
American black-and-white films
Films directed by Lewis Milestone
1929 crime films
United Artists films
Films with screenplays by Jules Furthman
Films produced by Joseph M. Schenck
American crime films
1920s English-language films
1920s American films